Mesobaena is a genus of amphisbaenians in the family Amphisbaenidae, commonly known as worm lizards. The genus is endemic to South America.

Species
Two species are placed in this genus.
Mesobaena huebneri  - Inirida worm lizard
Mesobaena rhachicephala

Etymology
The specific name, huebneri, is in honor of German pioneer photographer George Huebner (1862–1935), who collected the holotype.

References

Further reading

Gans C (2005). "Checklist and Bibliography of the Amphisbaenia of the World". Bull. American Mus. Nat. Hist. (289): 1–130.
Mertens R (1925). "Eine neue Eidechsengattung aus der Familie der Leposterniden ". Senckenbergiana 7 (5): 170–171. (Mesobaena, new genus; M. huebneri, new species). (in German).

 
Lizard genera
Taxa named by Robert Mertens